The 2015 Norwegian Football Cup was the 110th season of the Norwegian annual knock-out football tournament. It began with qualification matches in March 2015. The first round was played 21, 22 and 23 April 2015 and the tournament was ended with the Final being held on 22 November 2015.

The victory would have earned Rosenborg a place in the second qualifying round of the 2016–17 UEFA Europa League, but since the club already had qualified to the 2016–17 UEFA Champions League as winners of the 2015 Tippeligaen, this berth was passed down to Odd, fourth-place fininshers in the league.

Calendar
Below are the dates for each round as given by the official schedule:

Source:

First round
The 49 winners from the Second Qualifying Round joined with 79 clubs from the Tippeligaen, First Division and Second Division in this round of the competition.

|colspan="3" style="background-color:#97DEFF"|21 April 2015

|-
|colspan="3" style="background-color:#97DEFF"|22 April 2015

{{OneLegResult|Varegg||4–2|Florø}}

|-
|colspan="3" style="background-color:#97DEFF"|23 April 2015|}

Second round
The 64 winners from the First Round took part in this stage of the competition. These matches took place on 6 and 7 May 2015.

|colspan="3" style="background-color:#97DEFF"|6 May 2015|-
|colspan="3" style="background-color:#97DEFF"|7 May 2015|}

Third round
The 32 winners from the Second Round took part in this stage of the competition. These matches took place on 2, 3 and 4 June 2015.

|colspan="3" style="background-color:#97DEFF"|2 June 2015|-
|colspan="3" style="background-color:#97DEFF"|3 June 2015|-
|colspan="3" style="background-color:#97DEFF"|4 June 2015|}

Fourth round
The 16 winners from the Third Round took part in this stage of the competition. These matches took place on 24 June 2015.

|colspan="3" style="background-color:#97DEFF"|24 June 2015'''

|}

Quarter-finals
The 8 winners from the Fourth Round took part in this stage of the competition. The matches were played on 12 and 13 August 2015.

Semi-finals
The 4 winners from the Quarter-finals takes part in this stage of the competition. These matches were played on 23 and 24 September 2015.

Final

The 2015 Norwegian Football Cup Final was played between Rosenborg and Sarpsborg 08 at Ullevaal Stadion in Oslo on 22 November 2015.

References

 
Norwegian Football Cup seasons
Cup
Norway